Neozavrelia is a genus of non-biting midges in the subfamily Chironominae of the bloodworm family Chironomidae. From the tribe Tanytarsini, There are 23 described species.

Distribution
They are found worldwide, excluding Africa and the Neotropical geographical regions.

Species
N. bowmani Cranston, 1998
N. luteola Goetghebuer & Thienemann, 1941
N. optoputealis Cranston, 1998

References

Chironomidae
Diptera of Europe